Tomáš Svoboda may refer to:

Tomáš Svoboda (composer) (1939–2022), French-born American classical composer 
Tomáš Svoboda (ice hockey) (born 1987), Czech ice hockey forward 
Tomáš Svoboda (triathlete) (born 1985), Czech triathlete and aquathlete